Sheila Kelley (born October 9, 1963) is an American actress. She is known for her roles as Gwen Taylor on L.A. Law, Dr. Charlotte "Charley" Bennett Hayes on Sisters, and Debbie Wexler on The Good Doctor.

Early life
Kelley was raised in Greensburg, Pennsylvania, the youngest child in a household of six daughters and three sons. The two eldest were children of Leonard and Kate Thom; following Thom's 1950 death in a train accident, Kate married mining engineer and inventor Jay Kelley, with whom she had seven children including Sheila.

Kelley studied ballet, anatomy and movement physiology at New York University's Tisch School of the Arts. One day during the months immediately following her freshman year, Kelley began suffering from the effects of congenital hip dysplasia, which ended her hopes of a dance career. Kelley switched to taking acting classes, and graduated from New York University with a Bachelor of Fine Arts degree.  After working in public relations, she acquired a talent agent, began performing in plays, and with friends formed an Off-Off-Broadway theater troupe, The Elephant Company.

Career
Kelley began her acting career in the 1980s in television, with her first credited TV role in 1987. Her first film was Some Girls in 1988. She played the character Gwen Taylor in the legal drama L.A. Law from 1990 to 1993. Most of her work has been in guest roles on American TV series, although she notably played a stripper and performed a seductive dance routine onscreen in the 2000 feature film Dancing at the Blue Iguana.

Kelley was cast in a recurring role in the final season of Lost in 2010, playing Zoe. From 2011 to 2012, she played Carol Rhodes on Gossip Girl.

Personal life
Kelley and actor Richard Schiff married in 1996. Kelley was cast to play his love interest, and later his wife, on The Good Doctor. They have a son, Gus, born in 1994, and a daughter, Ruby, born in August 2000.

Following her role as a stripper in the film Dancing at the Blue Iguana (2000), Kelley became a fan of pole dancing, and built a national chain of exercise studios around her "S Factor" exercise method, including her book, S Factor: Strip Workouts for Every Woman, DVDs, and inspirational monthly editorials at the "S Factor" website. Her fitness program incorporates Pilates, yoga, stretching and pole dance routines.

Filmography

References

External links 

 Sheila Kelley's S Factor
Sheila Kelley – Let’s Get Naked: A Talk About Men, Women and the Erotic Creature
Sheila Kelley Official Website

20th-century American actresses
21st-century American actresses
Actresses from Pennsylvania
American film actresses
American television actresses
Living people

People from Greensburg, Pennsylvania
1963 births